Claude Jean Pierre Érignac (15 December 1937 – 6 February 1998) was a French prefect on the island of Corsica.

Érignac was born in Mende, Lozère. In the course of his political career, he had been prefect of several departments and overseas departments since 1967. In 1996 he went to Ajaccio in Corsica to take office as the Prefect of Corse-du-Sud. He was assassinated at 9:15 p.m. on 6 February 1998 in Ajaccio on his way to a classical music concert by two gunmen, who shot him three times with a 9 mm Beretta pistol. The weapon had been stolen on 6 September 1997, when members of the National Liberation Front of Corsica stormed a gendarmerie barracks at Pietrosella. Corsican nationalist militant Yvan Colonna was suspected of the killing, and was arrested in 2003. He was found guilty for the third time in June 2011 for the murder and sentenced to life imprisonment.  

Érignac's wife, children and some associates established the Claude-Érignac Association soon after his death. The bylaws of the association were published in the Journal officiel on 5 February 2000. 

The French Ministry of the Interior at Place Beauvau in Paris, inaugurated a hall in his name in the ministry.

References

 

1937 births
1998 deaths
People from Mende, Lozère
University of Paris alumni
Sciences Po alumni
École nationale d'administration alumni
Assassinated French politicians
French murder victims
People murdered in France
Prefects of France
Prefects of Meurthe-et-Moselle
Prefects of Yvelines
Prefects of Corse-du-Sud
Deaths by firearm in France
French civil servants